Masika Kalysha Tucker, known professionally as Masika Kalysha is an American actress, reality television personality, singer/songwriter, entrepreneur and businesswoman. She is best known for her role on VH1 series Love & Hip Hop: Hollywood, and We TV's Growing Up Hip Hop: Atlanta. Tucker is a French Creole video vixen and singer, originally from Chicago, Illinois.

Early life 
Kalysha was born Masika Kalysha Tucker in June 7, 1985 in Chicago, Illinois. She was raised in Jonesboro, Georgia and she is French Creole. In 2003, Kalysha graduated from Mount Zion High School in Jonesboro, Georgia. On August 11, 2011, Kalysha moved to Los Angeles, California, to pursue her acting and modeling career after the death of one of her friends Lashawna Threatt.

Career

Film and reality television
In 2005, Kalysha appeared in the music video for "So What" by Field Mob. In 2006, Kalysha made her acting debut in the film Three Can Play That Game.

In 2013, Kalysha made her first reality television appearance on Love & Hip Hop: Hollywood. She did not appear in season 2, but returned for season 3, which chronicled the birth of her daughter, Khari Barbie Maxwell, and her subsequent co-parenting with Fetty Wap.

In 2014, Kalysha started filming for the action movie The Prey with Kevin Grevioux, Danny Trejo and Nick Chinlund. The film hit theaters in May 2020.

In 2017, Kalysha returned to Love & Hip Hop: Hollywood for its fourth season. This was amid tensions with the show's producers, allegedly due to her refusal to film with a new cast member. The season revealed scenes of Kalysha breaking the fourth wall several times to express her displeasure with producers, as well as threatening legal action and storming off set.

In 2018, Kalysha decided not to return to Love and Hip Hop. She quit the show after the season's reunion special, unhappy with her portrayal. Kalysha left VH1 and was later cast on Growing Up Hip Hop: Atlanta.

Music
In 2015, Kalysha released her single "Andale" featuring Fetty Wap. The single is different from Kalysha's two previous singles, "No More" and "Hella Hollywood," in which both were released early spring 2015. Her single "Hella Hollywood" released May 2015 sampling the 1996 Fugees hit record Ready or Not.

Kalysha released her single "My Own" in the fall of 2016 singing about the relationship between her and rapper Fetty Wap. She released another single "OHHH3X" fall of 2017.

Personal life 
On December 11, 2015, Kalysha announced her pregnancy with rapper Fetty Wap. On March 29, 2016, she gave birth to a daughter. On October 28, 2022, Kalysha announced to social media that she had given birth to her second daughter, her first with her husband Jamar Champ.

Business career 
Kalysha launched Khari Barbie Beauty, an all vegan cruelty-free, gluten-free, and paraben-free cosmetics line on December 17, 2016. The name of her cosmetics line was inspired after her daughter Khari Barbie Maxwell. The cosmetic line includes lip scrub, lip pencils, lipstick tubes and hair growth supplements.

References

External links 

Living people
Actresses from Chicago
1985 births
Participants in American reality television series
Singers from Chicago